Sasinkovo is a village and municipality in Hlohovec District in the Trnava Region of western Slovakia.

History
In historical records the village was first mentioned in 1256.

Geography
The municipality lies at an altitude of 196 metres and covers an area of 12.412 km². It has a population of about 872 people.

References

External links
http://www.statistics.sk/mosmis/eng/run.html

Villages and municipalities in Hlohovec District